The 1981 Federation Cup (also known as the 1981 Federation Cup by NEC for sponsorship purposes) was the 19th edition of the most important competition between national teams in women's tennis.  The tournament was held at the Tamagawa-en Racquet Club in Tokyo, Japan, from 9–15 November. The United States won their sixth consecutive title, defeating Great Britain in the final, in what was a rematch of the 1967 Federation Cup.

Participating Teams

Draw
All ties were played at the Tamagawa-en Racquet Club in Tokyo, Japan, on clay courts.

1st and 2nd round losing teams play in consolation rounds.

First round

United States vs. South Korea

Spain vs. Mexico

Indonesia vs. Israel

Hungary vs. Romania

Switzerland vs. Greece

New Zealand vs. Chinese Taipei

Brazil vs. Ireland

Japan vs. West Germany

Czechoslovakia vs. Sweden

Denmark vs. Soviet Union

France vs. Canada

Belgium vs. Great Britain

Netherlands vs. Hong Kong

Italy vs. Yugoslavia

Thailand vs. China

Philippines vs. Australia

Second round

United States vs. Spain

Israel vs. Romania

Switzerland vs. Chinese Taipei

Brazil vs. West Germany

Czechoslovakia vs. Soviet Union

France vs. Great Britain

Netherlands vs. Italy

China vs. Australia

Quarterfinals

United States vs. Romania

Switzerland vs. West Germany

Soviet Union vs. Great Britain

Netherlands vs. Australia

Semifinals

United States vs. Switzerland

Great Britain vs. Australia

Final

United States vs. Great Britain

Consolation rounds

Draw

First round

Sweden vs. Denmark

Canada vs. Belgium

Philippines vs. Thailand

Yugoslavia vs. Hong Kong

Greece vs. New Zealand

Japan vs. Ireland

Hungary vs. Indonesia

Mexico vs. South Korea

Second round

Spain vs. Denmark

Israel vs. Belgium

Brazil vs. Philippines

Chinese Taipei vs. Yugoslavia

Greece vs. Italy

Japan vs. China

South Korea vs. Czechoslovakia

Quarterfinals

Spain vs. Belgium

Brazil vs. Yugoslavia

Italy vs. China

Hungary vs. Czechoslovakia

Semifinals

Spain vs. Brazil

Italy vs. Czechoslovakia

Final

Brazil vs. Czechoslovakia

References

Billie Jean King Cups by year
Federation
Tennis tournaments in Japan
Sports competitions in Tokyo
Federation
1981 in women's tennis
1981 in Japanese tennis